Morgan Lundin (born 20 May 1969) is an athlete from Sweden who competes in compound archery. He was the 2005 world champion and is a former world number one archer.

References

External links
 
 

1969 births
Living people
Swedish male archers
World Archery Championships medalists
Competitors at the 2001 World Games
20th-century Swedish people
21st-century Swedish people